The Leica M mount is a camera lens mount introduced in 1954 with the Leica M3, and a range of lenses. It has been used on all the Leica M-series cameras and certain accessories (e.g. Visoflex reflex viewing attachment) up to the current film Leica M-A and digital Leica M11 cameras.

This lens mount has also been used by Epson, Ricoh, Minolta, Konica, Cosina Voigtländer, Rollei, Carl Zeiss AG and Rollei Fototechnic on some of their cameras.

Overview
The Leica M mount was introduced in 1954 at that year's Photokina show, with the Leica M3 as its first camera. The 'M' stands for Messsucher or rangefinder in German. This new camera abandoned the M39 lens mount in favour of a new bayonet mount. The bayonet mount allowed lenses to be changed more quickly and made the fitting more secure. Other innovations introduced by the M3 included a single window for the viewfinder (for composition) and the rangefinder (for focusing). With a double-stroke film advance lever (later models have a single-stroke lever). The M3 was a success and over 220,000 units were sold, by the time production ended in 1966. It remains the best-selling M mount camera ever made. The M3 uses 135 film (or 35 mm film), with the canister being loaded behind a detachable bottom plate. The M3 was followed by many other M mount cameras, released over 40 years, with many of the basic concepts remaining in these designs. With the introduction of the Through-the-lens metering (TTL) in the Leica M5 and the digital Leica M8 being the most notable innovations since then.

The lenses for the M mount were also introduced in 1954 and were based on the earlier M39 thread mount. Almost all M mount lenses are Prime lenses. These lenses are divided by Leica based on their maximum aperture number (also known as f-number). They are distinguished by their names:

M Mount camera bodies

Film cameras

Digital cameras

Professional

Entry

Monochrom

No display

Increased resolution

Other manufacturers
Epson R-D1 by Epson
Minolta CLE by Minolta
Hexar RF by Konica
Bessa R2A, R3A, R2M, R3M, R4M and R4A by Cosina Voigtländer
Rollei 35 RF by Rollei Fototechnic
Recent Zeiss Ikon rangefinder camera by Carl Zeiss AG
Ricoh GXR by Ricoh

M mount lenses

Other manufacturers
 Minolta
 Carl Zeiss
 Cosina Voigtländer
 Zenit M

See also

 Leica Camera

 Leica thread mount
 Mirrorless interchangeable-lens camera

References

External links
 About the M System
 Leica M Lenses
 Leica lens compendium by Thorsten Overgaard

 
 
Lens mounts